Iana Lebedeva (born 19 December 2001) is a Russian trampoline gymnast. She represented the Russian Olympic Committee at the 2020 Olympics and finished eleventh during the qualification round of the trampoline competition.

References

External links 
 

Living people
2001 births
Russian female trampolinists
Gymnasts from Saint Petersburg
Olympic gymnasts of Russia
Gymnasts at the 2020 Summer Olympics
21st-century Russian women